Achromobacter obae is a bacterium from the genus Achromobacter which contains the enzyme alpha-amino-epsilon-caprolactam racemase. The complete genome of A. obae has been sequenced.

See also
 List of sequenced bacterial genomes

References 

Burkholderiales